The 1896–97 international cricket season was from September 1896 to April 1897. The season included only first-class tours among Australia, England and the West Indies.

Season overview

References

International cricket competitions by season
1896 in cricket
1897 in cricket